Fun to Be Fit is an educational series of three short films produced in 1982 by Walt Disney Educational to explain fitness.  This series was a live action series.

1982 
List of films in the series: 
 Getting Physically Fit Presents a Fitness Program 
 Physical Fitness, the Value of Fitness 
 Why Be Physically Fit? On the Energy Gain and The Stress Gestion Effort

References

Disney documentary films
Disney educational films
Disney short film series
1982 films
1980s educational films
1980s American films